This is the list of cathedrals in Iceland sorted by denomination.

Lutheran
Cathedrals of the Church of Iceland:
 Hólar Cathedral in Hólar
 Reykjavík Cathedral in Reykjavík
 Skálholt Cathedral in Skálholt

Roman Catholic 
Cathedrals of the Roman Catholic Church in Iceland:
 Landakotskirkja (Landakot's Church), formally named Basilika Krists konungs (The Basilica of Christ the King) in Reykjavík

References 

 
Iceland
Cathedrals